Five ships of the Royal Navy have borne the name HMS Wave:

  an  wooden screw gunboat launched in 1856, renamed Clinker in 1882 and sold in 1890
  a tender purchased in 1882 and sold in 1907
  a despatch vessel purchased in 1914, renamed Wayward in 1919 and foundered under tow in 1922
 HMS Wave a W-class destroyer cancelled in 1918
  an  launched in 1944 and scrapped in 1962

References
 

Royal Navy ship names